Jack Storey may refer to:

Jack Storey (footballer) (born 1929), Australian rules footballer
Jack Storey, character in Before I Wake (1954 film)

See also
John Storey (disambiguation)